James Birch (30 December 1889 – 17 April 1968) was an English-born international rugby union prop who played club rugby for Northampton and Neath was capped twice for Wales. Birch was selected for Wales in a tit for tat reprisal by the Welsh Rugby Union after the Rugby Football Union selected Welshman Stanley Williams for England.

Rugby career
Birch first came to note as a rugby player when he turned out for Northampton at the age of sixteen. He moved to Wales where he joined Neath. He was selected by the Welsh Rugby Union to play for the Wales national team during the 1911 Five Nations Championship, playing in two games, against France and Scotland. This was an excellent campaign for Wales and Birch found himself part of a Triple Crown and Grand Slam winning team.

As well as representing Neath, Birch also played for Glamorgan Police RFC, after joining the Glamorgan Constabulary in April 1910. In 1912 he switched clubs to first-class side Cardiff and spent three seasons with the club from 1912-13 to 1919-1920. He made 175 appearances for Cardiff. On his retirement he returned to Northampton where he served on the Northampton RFC committee.

International matches played
Wales
  1911
  1911

Bibliography

References

1889 births
1968 deaths
Cardiff RFC players
English rugby union players
Glamorgan Police RFC players
Glamorgan Police officers
Neath RFC players
Northampton Saints players
Rugby union players from Northampton
Rugby union props
Wales international rugby union players
Welsh police officers